"Best of My Love" is a song by American band the Emotions from their fourth studio album Rejoice (1977). It was composed by Maurice White and Al McKay of Earth, Wind & Fire, and produced by White and Clarence McDonald.

Released as the album's lead single on June 9, 1977, the song topped both the US Billboard Hot 100 and US Billboard R&B charts. It also reached the top five in the UK and Canada, the top 10 in New Zealand, and the top 20 in Australia.

"Best of My Love" won a Grammy at the 20th Annual Grammy Awards (1977) for Best R&B Performance By A Duo Or Group With Vocals; it also won an American Music Award for Favorite Soul/R&B Single.

Overview
The song was ranked at number 87 on "The Billboard Hot 100 All-Time Top Songs". It was also the third biggest pop song of 1977 and the fifth biggest R&B song of 1977. "Best of My Love" has been certified platinum in the US by the RIAA and silver in the UK by the BPI.

Recent reviews have been largely positive, and the song continues to appear on "Best of the '70s" lists. In 2015, Billboard ranked the song at number one on their list of the Top 40 Biggest Girl Group Songs of All Time on the Billboard Hot 100 chart. Billboard also ranked the track at number 10 on their list of 100 Greatest Girl Group Songs of All Time. In 2018, "Best of My Love" was ranked at number six on Heavy's list of Top 51 Best Love Songs: The Heavy Power List.

Song description
The song has an upbeat vibe, with a prominent bass line and horns accenting the drums between the verses and chorus.

Composition
"Best of My Love" was originally published in the key of C major in common time with a tempo of 120 beats per minute. The vocals span from C4 to A5 (although in the outro of the song, one of the Emotions hits a C6).

Critical reception
Craig Lytle of AllMusic called  "Best of My Love" a "rapidly paced" song. Lytle added "This spirited cut is seasoned with a fierce arrangement, in particular the horns, and incomparable vocals." Robert Hilburn of the Los Angeles Times described the tune as "one of the year's most delightful singles".

Commercial performance
The single achieved huge success, remaining on top of the US Billboard Hot 100 chart for five non-consecutive weeks and reaching number one on the R&B Singles Chart. On the disco chart, "Best of My Love" peaked at number 11. Eventually, the single received a Platinum certification from (RIAA), becoming the Emotions' biggest hit to date and their only single to receive a certification.

Personnel
Clarence McDonald – piano, clavinet 
Paulinho da Costa – percussion 
Al McKay – guitar
Larry Dunn – synthesizer 
Verdine White – bass
Fred White – drums
Tom Tom 84 (Thomas Washington) – string and horn arrangements

Charts

Weekly charts

Year-end charts

All-time charts

Certifications

Cover versions
British reggae singer C. J. Lewis covered "Best of My Love" and released it as a single on September 26, 1994. His version reached number 13 on the UK Singles Chart, becoming his last top-20 hit there, and peaked at number 11 in New Zealand.

References

1977 singles
1977 songs
The Emotions songs
Billboard Hot 100 number-one singles
Cashbox number-one singles
C. J. Lewis songs
Songs written by Maurice White
Songs written by Al McKay
Columbia Records singles
Disco songs
Song recordings produced by Maurice White